Sarban-e Damuyi (also Romanized as Sārbān-e Damūyī) is a village in Jolgeh-ye Chah Hashem Rural District, Jolgeh-ye Chah Hashem District, Dalgan County, Sistan and Baluchestan Province, Iran. At the 2006 census, its population was 84, in 15 families.

References 

Populated places in Dalgan County